Mohammad Anamul Haque Bijoy (born 16 December 1992) is a Bangladeshi cricketer. He is a wicket-keeper and an opening right-handed batsman. He is the first player to score 1000 runs and most runs in a single List-A tournament.

Early life
His hometown is Kushtia. He went to Kushtia Zilla School until the sixth grade. Later he was a student at Bangladesh Krira Shikkha Protishtan.

U19 career
He captained the Bangladesh U 19 world cup team in Australia and came out as the highest run scorer in the tournament. He made two hundred and won a Player of the Match there.

Domestic career
Anamul made his first-class debut for Dhaka Division in the National Cricket League in late 2008. He earned the early call-up through some impressive work at the BKSP, the country's biggest sports institute.

In September 2017, he scored his maiden double-century in first-class cricket, when he made 216 for Khulna Division against Rangpur Division in the 2017–18 National Cricket League.

He was the leading run-scorer in the 2018–19 Bangladesh Cricket League, with 658 runs in six matches. He was also the leading run-scorer for Prime Bank Cricket Club in the 2018–19 Dhaka Premier Division Cricket League tournament, with 552 runs in 16 matches.

In May 2021, he was named as the captain in Prime Bank Cricket Club's squad for the 2021 Dhaka Premier Division Twenty20 Cricket League. In the 2021–22 Dhaka Premier Division Cricket League, he became the first batter in the League's history to score 1,000 runs in a season.

Bangladesh Premier League

Dhaka Gladiators
In the 2012 Bangladesh Premier League, Dhaka Gladiators bought Anamul for $20,000. He scored 176 runs in 12 matches. In the 2013 season of BPL, he was bought again by the Dhaka Gladiators for $121,000. Anamul was the second top-scorer for his team that season scoring 356 runs in 13 innings along with 3 fifties.

Chittagong Vikings
Anamul was signed by the Chittagong Kings in the 2015 Bangladesh Premier League. He accumulated 142 runs in the nine innings he played. The following season playing for the same team, Anamul scored 250 runs in 13 innings with 1 fifty. In the 2017-18 season, he scored 206 runs in 9 innings with 2 half-centuries.

Comilla Victorians
Anamul played the 2018-19 Bangladesh Premier League for the Comilla Victorians. He scored 200 runs in 14 innings.

Dhaka Platoon
In the 2019-20 Bangladesh Premier League, Anamul played for the Dhaka Platoon. He scored 198 runs in 13 innings that season with 1 50+ hand.

Sylhet Sunrisers
In the 2021-22 Bangladesh Premier League season, Anamul scored 280 runs in 9 innings playing for the Sylhet Sunrisers with 1 half-century.

International career
He made his place in Bangladesh squad for 2012 Asia Cup. He made his Test debut against Sri Lanka on 8 March 2013 at Galle.
He made his ODI debut against West Indies in Bangladesh in the first game of 2012 Sahara Cup in Khulna and went on to make his maiden century in the second game of the series on 2 December 2012. His match winning 120 earned him the title of the Player of the Match only in his second ODI of his career.

His knock of 120 against West Indies at Khulna was nominated to be one of the best ODI batting performances of the year by ESPNCricinfo.

He was then called up for the Bangladesh squad for the 2015 Cricket World Cup. He played as an opening batsmen alongside Tamim Iqbal.  On the fifth of March, Anamul dislocated his shoulder while trying to save a boundary and that resulted in him being ruled out of the world cup. Anamul was ruled into Bangladesh national cricket team in West Indies series  but he didn't perform as well as expected.

Records and achievements
 He is the first cricketer to score 1,000 or more runs in a single season of a List A cricket tournament.

References

External links 
 

1992 births
Living people
People from Kushtia District
Bangladeshi cricketers
Bangladesh Test cricketers
Bangladesh One Day International cricketers
Bangladesh Twenty20 International cricketers
Dhaka Dominators cricketers
Cricketers at the 2015 Cricket World Cup
Asian Games medalists in cricket
Cricketers at the 2014 Asian Games
Asian Games bronze medalists for Bangladesh
Medalists at the 2014 Asian Games
Dhaka Division cricketers
Khulna Division cricketers
Chattogram Challengers cricketers
Abahani Limited cricketers
Kala Bagan Cricket Academy cricketers
Gazi Group cricketers
Victoria Sporting Club cricketers
Bangladesh South Zone cricketers
Bangladesh A cricketers
Quetta Gladiators cricketers
Comilla Victorians cricketers
Prime Bank Cricket Club cricketers
South Asian Games gold medalists for Bangladesh
South Asian Games medalists in cricket
Wicket-keepers